The 1989 All Japan Sports Prototype Car Endurance Championship was the seventh season of the All Japan Sports Prototype Championship. The 1989 champion was the #25 Advan Alpha Nova Porsche 962C driven by Kunimitsu Takahashi.

Schedule
All races were held in Japan.

 – Round 4 at the Suzuka Circuit was originally scheduled for 27 August; however, due to a typhoon the race was rescheduled for 3 December.

Entry list

Season results
Season results as follows:

Point Ranking

Drivers

Makes

References

External links
 1989 全日本スポーツプロトタイプカー耐久選手権 

JSPC seasons
All Japan Sports Prototype